Grey East was an electoral riding in Ontario, Canada. It was created in 1875 for eastern portions of Grey North and Grey South. It was renamed and redistributed in 1886 as the riding of Grey Centre before being abolished in 1925 before the 1926 election.

Members of Provincial Parliament

References

Former provincial electoral districts of Ontario